White Lives Matter (WLM) is a neo-Nazi slogan that began to be used in 2015 in a response to the Black Lives Matter (BLM) social justice movement. It seeks to address racism against White people, and purported claims of white genocide. The Aryan Renaissance Society, a White supremacist organization, was one group that initially promoted the phrase "White Lives Matter". Later in the year, the term was used by the Ku Klux Klan. In August 2016, the Southern Poverty Law Center added the phrase to its list of hate groups and considers it a Neo Nazi group.

The "White Lives Matter" slogan was chanted by alt-right protesters during the 2017 Unite the Right rally in Charlottesville, Virginia. On October 28, 2017, numerous White Lives Matter rallies broke out in Tennessee. Dominated in Shelbyville particularly, protesters justified their movement in response to the increasing number of immigrants and refugees to Middle Tennessee.

The phrase has also been active in the United Kingdom, albeit with a low turnout. On June 22, 2020, as players, with "Black Lives Matter" printed on their shirts in place of their names, were taking the knee before kick off to a Burnley F.C. away match to Manchester City, a plane flew over the Etihad Stadium carrying the banner "White Lives Matter Burnley". The next month, the pilot and his wife were both fired from their workplaces for having made racist social media posts. Later in the month, a "White Lives Matter" slogan was etched into a park hillside in Bedworth, England. Police, who were treating it as racially-aggravated criminal damage and a hate crime, were aware of footage on social media appearing to show someone in clothing "resembling a Ku Klux Klan outfit" at the same site.

White Lives Matter rally
The Nationalist Front was a key organizer of the White Lives Matter rally in Shelbyville and Murfreesboro, Tennessee, on October 28, 2017. Participating groups included: National Socialist Movement (NSM), Traditionalist Worker Party (TWP), League of the South, Vanguard America, The Right Stuff, and Anti-Communist Action. It was a key rally since the Unite the Right rally in Charlottesville, Virginia (August 11 and 12, 2017). The rally was said by group leaders to address the "ongoing problem of refugee resettlement in Middle Tennessee," failure to build a border wall between the United States and Mexico, the removal of Sudan from the list of countries in the Trump travel ban, fight against the DREAM Act, as well as the Burnette Chapel shooting by Sudanese native Emmanuel Sampson.

The Shelbyville rally took place as scheduled, with about 100 White Lives Matter supporters and about 200 counter-protestors. The afternoon event in Murfreesboro was canceled by the organizers; the authorities estimated that around 800 to 1000 people took part in the anti-racist march and counter-protest. In addition, local community and faith activists organized an off-site rally under the moniker of "Murfreesboro Loves". Hundreds participated in the event in support of refugees and minorities.

White Lives Matter in 2021 
In 2021, another series of nationwide "White Lives Matter" Rallies were held. Notably in Raleigh, North Carolina; Huntington Beach, California; Philadelphia; New York City; Albuquerque, New Mexico; and Fort Worth, Texas. These rallies all had little far-right attendance and had thousands of counter-protestors.

Usage

Kanye West
On October 3, 2022, during his Yeezy SZN 9 fashion show in Paris, Kanye West wore a shirt with the slogan "WHITE LIVES MATTER" written on it, a move described by Forbes as controversial. The front of the shirts have a picture of Pope John Paul II captioned "Juan Pablo II"  Conservative commentator Candace Owens posed for a photo with West wearing a matching shirt with the slogan. He explained his choice in the following way: “At a certain point, it felt like I saw White people wearing shirts that said Black Lives Matter, like, they were doing me such a favor by having a t-shirt that reminded me that my life mattered. Like I didn’t already know that. So, I thought I’d return the favor and let White people know, that hey, your life matters, too.”

Rotterdam

Election posters
During the 2022 Dutch municipal elections in Rotterdam, stickers containing the untranslated phrase or "traitor" were put on election posters belonging to the 50Plus, DENK, GroenLinks and PvdA parties. They made a joint statement and filed criminal complaints with the police, who investigated. National party leaders Lilianne Ploumen (PvdA) and Jesse Klaver (GroenLinks) distanced themselves from the texts. The stickers referred to a Telegram group named after the phrase which had spread other stickers in other localities, including one claiming "Race-mixing is white genocide".

Bridge projection
On New Year's Eve 2022-2023, the untranslated phrase was projected onto the Erasmus Bridge, among other racist slogans including the Fourteen Words and "black pete did nothing wrong". Police believe it was done from a boat. The Public Prosecution Service started an investigation.

World's Indigenous Peoples day
A growing number of White nationalist groups around the world have held an annual White Lives Matter activism which coincides with the United Nations designated International Day of the World's Indigenous Peoples observed on 9 August each year. The UK's Patriotic Alternative and New Zealand's Action Zealandia have done this.

References

White nationalism in the United Kingdom
White nationalism in the United States
2010s neologisms
2010s slang
2015 introductions
American political catchphrases
Kanye West
Slogans